Giacomo Favero (born 1 January 1991) is an Italian footballer who plays as a midfielder for Club Eagles.

Career

In 2010, Favero signed for Italian fourth tier side Torviscosa. In 2011, he signed for Rimini in the Italian third tier, where he made 8 league appearances and scored 0 goals. On 10 October 2011, Favero debuted for Rimini during a 1–0 win over Alessandria. Before the second half of 2012–13, he signed for Maltese top flight club Ħamrun Spartans. Before the second half of 2013–14, he signed for Birżebbuġa in the Maltese second tier.

In 2014, Favero signed for Italian fourth tier team Giorgione. In 2016, he signed for Licata in the Italian fifth tier. Before the second half of 2018–19, he signed for Italian fourth tier outfit Gela. In 2019, Favero signed for Pro Gorizia in the Italian fifth tier. Before the 2022 season, he signed for Maldivian side Club Eagles.

References

External links
 

1991 births
A.C. Sansovino players
A.S. Pro Gorizia players
A.S.D. Licata 1931 players
Association football midfielders
Club Eagles players
Dhivehi Premier League players
Eccellenza players
Expatriate footballers in Malta
Expatriate footballers in the Maldives
Floriana F.C. players
Ħamrun Spartans F.C. players
Italian expatriate footballers
Italian expatriate sportspeople in Malta
Italian footballers
Living people
Maltese Challenge League players
Maltese Premier League players
Rimini F.C. 1912 players
Serie C players
Serie D players
S.S.D. Città di Gela players